Field hockey at the 2012 Olympic Games in London took place from 29 July to 11 August at the Riverbank Arena within the Olympic Park.

On 13 November 2010 the International Hockey Federation (FIH) decided to allocate 12 teams for each men and women events respectively.

Germany won the men's tournament for the fourth time, and the women's tournament was won by the Netherlands — their third Olympic women's hockey title.

Competition schedule

Qualification
Each of the continental champions received a berth alongside the host, Great Britain (England, Scotland and Wales compete separately in most competitions, but send a combined team to the Olympics and selected friendly tournaments, which is managed by England Hockey), while another three spots were decided in qualifying tournaments.

For the men's tournament, Europe received two extra quota places, and Oceania one extra. While for the women's, Asia, Oceania and Europe each received one extra quota place. All were based on FIH world rankings.

However, South Africa as African champion for both tournaments gave up the automatic berth on the premise that they should play a qualifier having deemed the African tournament as sub-standard even though they won the African qualifier tournament. Instead they played in the men's and women's Olympic qualification tournament and made the cut. Their automatic berth was awarded to Spain in the men's tournament and Argentina in the women's.

Men's qualification

Women's qualification

 – South Africa won the African qualifier tournament but gave up their automatic berth on the premise that they should play a qualifier having deemed the African tournament as sub-standard. Eventually they won the Qualification Tournament 1. Instead, Argentina was invited as the highest ranked team not already qualified after the conclusion of the continental championships.

Men's tournament

Pool A

Pool B

Medal round

Final standings

Women's tournament

Pool A

Pool B

Medal round

Final standings

Medal summary

Medal table

Medalists

References

External links

 
 
 
 

 
2012 Summer Olympics events
Summer Olympics
2012 Summer Olympics
Field hockey at the Summer Olympics